The 1996 Troy State Trojans football team represented Troy State University—now known as Troy University—as a member of the Southland Football League during the 1996 NCAA Division I-AA football season. Led by sixth-year head coach Larry Blakeney, the Trojans compiled an overall record of 12–2 with a mark of 5–1 in conference play, winning the Southland title. They Trojans finished the season ranked No. 5 in the Sports Network poll. The team played home games at Veterans Memorial Stadium in Troy, Alabama.

Schedule

References

Troy State
Troy Trojans football seasons
Southland Conference football champion seasons
Troy State Trojans football